"Ancestress" is a song by Icelandic musician Björk, featuring backing vocals from her son Sindri Eldon. The song was released on 22 September 2022 as the third single from her tenth studio album Fossora. A music video directed by Andrew Thomas Huang was also released alongside the single.

Background

"Ancestress" was written as a tribute to Björk's mother, who died in 2018. In an interview with Pitchfork, she stated: "If I was a priest, it's what I would've said at the funeral." The song was "written in an epitaph in an Icelandic folk style" and features heavy use of strings and features vocals by Björk's son, Sindri Eldon. Eldon participated in the arrangement of the vocals alongside his mother. Like other tracks on Fossora, Soraya Nayyar contributes percussion to the song.

Reception 
"Ancestress" was named the 18th best song of 2022 by Pitchfork.

Personnel

Credits adapted from Björk's official website:

Björk – vocals, string arrangement, percussion arrangement, vocal arrangement, beat, programming, production
Sindri Eldon – vocals, vocal arrangement
Soraya Nayyar – percussion
Una Sveinbjarnardóttir – strings
Helga Þóra Björgvinsdóttir – strings
Laura Liu – strings
Ingrid Karlsdóttir – strings
Geirþrúður Ása Guðjónsdóttir – strings
Þórunn Ösk Marinósdóttir – strings
Lucia Koczot – strings
Sigurður Bjarki Gunnarsson – strings
Júlía Mogensen – strings
Xun Yang – strings
Ragnheiður Ingunn Jóhannsdóttir – conducting
Jake Miller – programming

References

2022 singles
2022 songs
Björk songs
Song recordings produced by Björk
Songs written by Björk